In linear algebra, the order-r Krylov subspace generated by an n-by-n matrix A and a vector b of dimension n is the linear subspace spanned by the images of b under the first r powers of A (starting from ), that is,

Background
The concept is named after Russian applied mathematician and naval engineer Alexei Krylov, who published a paper about it in 1931.

Properties
 .
Thus,  denotes the maximal dimension of a Krylov subspace.
Furthermore, there exists a  such that .
  can be decomposed as the direct sum of Krylov subspaces.

Use
Krylov subspaces are used in algorithms for finding approximate solutions to high-dimensional linear algebra problems. Many linear dynamical system tests in control theory, especially those related to controllability and observability, involve checking the rank of the Krylov subspace. These tests are equivalent to finding the span of the Gramians associated with the system/output maps so the uncontrollable and unobservable subspaces are simply the orthogonal complement to the Krylov subspace.

Modern iterative methods such as Arnoldi iteration can be used for finding one (or a few) eigenvalues of large sparse matrices or solving large systems of linear equations. They try to avoid matrix-matrix operations, but rather multiply vectors by the matrix and work with the resulting vectors. All algorithms that work this way are referred to as Krylov subspace methods; they are among the most successful methods currently available in numerical linear algebra.

Issues
Because the vectors usually soon become almost linearly dependent due to the properties of power iteration, methods relying on Krylov subspace frequently involve some orthogonalization scheme, such as Lanczos iteration for Hermitian matrices or Arnoldi iteration for more general matrices.

Existing methods
The best known Krylov subspace methods are the Conjugate gradient, IDR(s) (Induced dimension reduction), GMRES (generalized minimum residual), BiCGSTAB (biconjugate gradient stabilized), QMR (quasi minimal residual), TFQMR (transpose-free QMR) and MINRES (minimal residual method).

See also 
 Iterative method, which has a section on Krylov subspace methods

References

Further reading
 
 
 Gerard Meurant and Jurjen Duintjer Tebbens: ”Krylov methods for nonsymmetric linear systems - From theory to computations”, Springer Series in Computational Mathematics, vol.57, (Oct. 2020). , url=https://doi.org/10.1007/978-3-030-55251-0.
 Iman Farahbakhsh: "Krylov Subspace Methods with Application in Incompressible Fluid Flow Solvers", Wiley,  (Sep., 2020).

Numerical linear algebra
Invariant subspaces
Operator theory